Muzikant  is a 1948 Czechoslovak black-and-white film directed by František Čáp starring Josef Kemr.

Čáp received the Czech state ward for directing the film.

References

External links
 

1948 films
1940s Czech-language films
Czech drama films
Czechoslovak black-and-white films
1940s Czech films
Czechoslovak drama films